John Travilla Ramsay (February 21, 1925 – April 28, 2014) was an American basketball coach, commonly known as "Dr. Jack" (as he held an earned doctorate). He was best known for leading the Portland Trail Blazers to the 1977 NBA championship, and for his broadcasting work with the Indiana Pacers, the Miami Heat, and for ESPN TV and ESPN Radio. Ramsay was among the most respected coaches in NBA history and a member of the Naismith Memorial Basketball Hall of Fame. He was the winner of the Chuck Daly Lifetime Achievement Award for the 2009–10 NBA season.

Early life 
Growing up in Milford, Connecticut, Ramsay was encouraged to participate in sports in grade school by his parents, Anne and John. The family moved outside Philadelphia and Ramsay graduated from Upper Darby High School in 1942. Years after playing basketball, baseball and soccer in high school, he was inducted into the school's Wall of Fame in 1979. Strongly encouraged by his mother to attend college, Ramsay entered Saint Joseph's College. Ramsay's college career was interrupted by three  years of service in the US Navy during World War II. Ramsay played both basketball and baseball at St. Joseph's. In his senior year, Ramsay was coached in baseball by Pep Young, a teammate of professional baseball star Ty Cobb.  In 1949, Ramsay became the first member of his family to receive a college bachelor's degree. In 1962, Ramsay obtained his master's degree and in 1963 his doctorate degree in education, both from the University of Pennsylvania in Philadelphia

After graduation, Ramsay played six seasons of professional basketball in the Eastern Professional Basketball League (EPBL). As a sophomore playing guard, he was the second-leading scorer for the Harrisburg Senators in Harrisburg, Pennsylvania. Ramsay averaged 14 points in his career playing for the Senators and the Sunbury, Pennsylvania professional team. He was selected to the All-EPBL team four times. To supplement his playing income, he coached basketball at St. James High School for Boys in Chester, Pennsylvania and later at Mount Pleasant High School, 1953–4, in Wilmington, Delaware.

Coaching career

College 

After coaching in the high school and minor-league ranks during the early postwar years, Ramsay became head coach at St Joseph's in 1955. Ramsay got the job after accidentally meeting the college's moderator of athletics at a Philadelphia Phillies baseball game.  Ramsay was hired as coach for the 1955-56 basketball season for $3,500.

In Ramsay's first season at St Joseph, the Hawks went 23–6 to win their first Big 5 crown. This  first season also marked the school's first-ever postseason playoff berth, in which St Joseph placed third in the NIT after losing to the University of Dayton. Ramsay would remain at St. Joseph's through 1966, leading the Hawks to six more Big 5 crowns, five straight seasons of first-place finishes in the Middle Atlantic Conference, ten postseason appearances, and a Final Four stint in 1961.

At age 41, after leading his team to a 24–5 record in 1965–66, Ramsay was diagnosed with an edema on the retina of his right eye. Ramsay left his coaching job with the Hawks on the doctors' recommendation that he reduce stress. Ramsay finished with a record of 234–72 in 11 years.  He would remain the winningest coach in St. Joseph's history until Phil Martelli passed him in 2005.

Professional

Philadelphia 76ers
After leaving St Joseph's, Ramsay was hired as general manager by the Philadelphia 76ers. Team owner Irv Kosloff gave Ramsay a three-year $25,000 deal.

In 1968, Ramsay became the 76ers head coach. In Ramsay's first game coaching an NBA team, the 76ers zone press won 114–96 against the Los Angeles Lakers at the Spectrum, even though Lakers players Jerry West, Elgin Baylor and Wilt Chamberlain combined for 71 points. The 76ers finished that first season with Coach Ramsay 55–27.  The 76ers led the NBA  in scoring (119 points per game) as a result of Ramsay's style of aggressive pressing defense.

In his four seasons as 76ers coach, Ramsay led the team to three playoff appearances.  While the 76ers continued to be contenders, it was apparent that they were not the powerhouse that had been in the late 1960s. The team collapsed in 1971–72, when the 76ers posted a 30–52 record and missed the playoffs for the first time in team history. Only five years earlier, the Sixers had fielded the best record in league history.

Buffalo Braves
Ramsay signed a three‐year contract to succeed John McCarthy as the third-ever head coach of the Buffalo Braves on April 6, 1972. He inherited a team that finished each of the first two years of its existence in last place in the Atlantic Division. After compiling a losing 21–61 record in that first season in Buffalo, Ramsay had the team double their win total the next season by finishing first among the league's 17 teams in offense (111.6) even though they were last in defense (111.8). That second season in Buffalo had Ramsay leading the Braves to the playoffs, where they pushed the eventual champion Celtics to six games in the conference semifinals. His Buffalo tenure was almost a mirror image of his time with the Sixers—four seasons, three playoff berths; however, he did not leave Buffalo in the sort of wreckage that had occurred in Philadelphia. Instead, owner Paul Snyder was in the process of selling the team to out-of-town interests (the economy of Western New York was unable to support both the Braves and hockey's Sabres as evidenced by the Braves' attendance figures at the time but Snyder lost interest) and Ramsay requested not to be a part of the upheaval. His contract was not renewed on May 3, 1976, the day after the Braves were eliminated by the Celtics from the playoffs. In his four seasons with the Braves, Ramsay compiled a record of 158–170.

Portland Trail Blazers
In 1976, Ramsay became the head coach of the Portland Trail Blazers. When Ramsay arrived, the Blazers had not made the playoffs or compiled a winning season record in their six-year history. However, a young Blazers team, led by Bill Walton, was starting to jell. Ramsay also benefited from the 1976 ABA dispersal draft, in which the Blazers obtained power forward Maurice Lucas.

In his first season in Portland (1977), Ramsay led the Blazers to their first NBA title. In his second season, the Blazers were 50–10 after 60 games and favored to repeat as NBA champions. However, Walton broke his foot, ending the Blazers' winning prospects. Ramsay continued to coach the Blazers until 1986 with general success. However, he  never equaled the achievements of his first seasons. During Ramsay's last nine seasons in Portland, the Blazers only won two playoff series. He also coached the Western Conference side in the 1978 All-Star Game.

Indiana Pacers
Ramsay took over as coach of the Indiana Pacers for the 1986–87 season.  Ramsay coached the Pacers to their second winning record as an NBA team.  However, Ramsay was unable to duplicate that success in later seasons. Ramsay resigned as Pacers coach during the 1988–89 season after a 0–7 start.

When Ramsay left the Pacers, he was second on the all-time wins list for NBA coaches with 864 wins, trailing only Red Auerbach. When he retired, Ramsay had the most combined college and professional wins of any coach. In 1992, Ramsay was inducted into the Basketball Hall of Fame. The Trail Blazers retired Number 77 in Ramsay's honor on Jan. 14, 1993, symbolically recognizing the 1977 Championship.  In 1996, he was voted one of the 10 greatest coaches in NBA history.

Broadcasting and media 

After his coaching career ended, Ramsay spent nine years as a television color commentator for the Philadelphia 76ers and the Miami Heat. The games were broadcast from South Florida's Sunshine Network (now Sun Sports), Fox Sports Florida, and sometimes local Miami station WBFS (then a UPN affiliate). Ramsay worked alongside announcer Eric Reid.

During Ramsay's tenure as Heat commentator, he developed some memorable nicknames and phrases for the Heat players. Whenever point guard Tim Hardaway made a three-point shot, Ramsay  shouted, "this away, that away, Hardaway!" When Alonzo Mourning dunked the ball, Ramsay exclaimed "Zo with the stuffa!". Whenever a Heat player made a nice shot, Ramsay screamed "bottom of the net!" Also on ESPN Radio national broadcasts he coined the phrases, "One hand slamma" after a one handed dunk and, "two hand slamma jamma" after a two handed dunk.

Between 1996 and 2012, Ramsay called 15 NBA Finals for ESPN Radio, serving as the network's top analyst. He joined ESPN from the Heat full-time in 2000.

In addition to his TV and radio work, Ramsay authored several books, including The Coach's Art and Dr. Jack's Leadership Lessons Learned From a Lifetime in Basketball.

Personal life
Ramsay's son-in-law Jim O'Brien has been the head coach of the Boston Celtics, Philadelphia 76ers, Indiana Pacers and The University of Dayton, and grandson Jack O'Brien was the editor-in-chief of humor website Cracked.com. Grandson Geoff Dailey played baseball at Wesleyan University. His two eldest children, Susan and John, have doctoral degrees and taught at the college level. Another son, John, was an assistant dean at Carleton College. Ramsay counted on the late David Halberstam and Gay Talese as his friends. Ramsay was a devout Roman Catholic. An avid amateur tennis player, Ramsay and Van Miller (the Braves' radio announcer and a close friend of Ramsay's) often played as a doubles team.

Ramsay had a pair of concussions in his playing career; one happened while playing a college game in 1948, the second in 1954 during an Eastern League game. In 1999, a routine medical exam revealed  an early diagnosis of prostate cancer. The ensuing therapy led to a successful treatment that Ramsay didn't miss a single game that season as commentator. In October 2004, Ramsay was diagnosed with melanoma. He had another bout with the disease in his later years. On May 10, 2013, Ramsay announced that he was again starting cancer treatment, ending his broadcasting career.

Death
Ramsay died of cancer in his sleep the night of April 28, 2014.  He was 89. Ramsay's longtime employer ESPN announced his death on Twitter.

Head coaching record

NBA

|-
| align="left" |Philadelphia
| align="left" |
|82||55||27||.671|| align="center" |2nd in East||5||1||4||.200
| align="center" |Lost in Division Semifinals
|- 
| align="left" |Philadelphia
| align="left" |
|82||42||40||.512|| align="center" |4th in East||5||1||4||.200
| align="center" |Lost in Division Semifinals
|-
| align="left" |Philadelphia
| align="left" |
|82||47||35||.573|| align="center" |2nd in Atlantic||7||3||4||.429
| align="center" |Lost in Conf. Semifinals
|-
| align="left" |Philadelphia
| align="left" |
|82||30||52||.366|| align="center" |3rd in Atlantic||—||—||—||—
| align="center" |Missed Playoffs
|-
| align="left" |Buffalo
| align="left" |
|82||21||61||.256|| align="center" |3rd in Atlantic||—||—||—||—
| align="center" |Missed Playoffs
|-
| align="left" |Buffalo
| align="left" |
|82||42||40||.512|| align="center" |3rd in Atlantic||6||2||4||.333
| align="center" |Lost in Conf. Semifinals
|-
| align="left" |Buffalo
| align="left" |
|82||49||33||.598|| align="center" |2nd in Atlantic||7||3||4||.429
| align="center" |Lost in Conf. Semifinals
|-
| align="left" |Buffalo
| align="left" |
|82||46||36||.561|| align="center" |2nd in Atlantic||9||4||5||.444
| align="center" |Lost in Conf. Semifinals
|- ! style="background:#FDE910;"
| align="left" |Portland
| align="left" |
|82||49||33||.598|| align="center" |2nd in Pacific||19||14||5||.737
| align="center" |Won NBA Championship
|-
| align="left" |Portland
| align="left" |
|82||58||24||.707|| align="center" |1st in Pacific||6||2||4||.333
| align="center" |Lost in Conf. Semifinals
|-
| align="left" |Portland
| align="left" |
|82||45||37||.549|| align="center" |4th in Pacific||3||1||2||.333
| align="center" |Lost in First Round
|-
| align="left" |Portland
| align="left" |
|82||38||44||.463|| align="center" |4th in Pacific||3||1||2||.333
| align="center" |Lost in First Round
|-
| align="left" |Portland
| align="left" |
|82||45||37||.549|| align="center" |3rd in Pacific||3||1||2||.333
| align="center" |Lost in First Round
|-
| align="left" |Portland
| align="left" |
|82||42||40||.512|| align="center" |5th in Pacific||—||—||—||—
| align="center" |Missed Playoffs
|-
| align="left" |Portland
| align="left" |
|82||46||36||.561|| align="center" |4th in Pacific||7||3||4||.429
| align="center" |Lost in Conf. Semifinals
|-
| align="left" |Portland
| align="left" |
|82||48||34||.585|| align="center" |2nd in Pacific||5||2||3||.400
| align="center" |Lost in First Round
|-
| align="left" |Portland
| align="left" |
|82||42||40||.512|| align="center" |2nd in Pacific||9||4||5||.444
| align="center" |Lost in Conf. Semifinals
|-
| align="left" |Portland
| align="left" |
|82||40||42||.482|| align="center" |2nd in Pacific||4||1||3||.250
| align="center" |Lost in First Round
|-
| align="left" |Indiana
| align="left" |
|82||41||41||.500|| align="center" |4th in Central||4||1||3||.250
| align="center" |Lost in First Round
|-
| align="left" |Indiana
| align="left" |
|82||38||44||.463|| align="center" |6th in Central||—||—||—||—
| align="center" |Missed Playoffs
|-
| align="left" |Indiana
| align="left" |
|7||0||7||.000|| align="center" |(resigned)||—||—||—||—
| align="center" |-
|-class="sortbottom"
| align="left" |Career
| ||1,647||864||783||.525|| ||102||44||58||.431

See also
 List of NCAA Division I Men's Final Four appearances by coach

References

External links

1925 births
2014 deaths
American men's basketball coaches
American men's basketball players
United States Navy personnel of World War II
American Roman Catholics
Basketball coaches from Pennsylvania
Basketball players from Philadelphia
Buffalo Braves head coaches
Deaths from cancer in Florida
College men's basketball head coaches in the United States
Guards (basketball)
Indiana Pacers head coaches
Miami Heat announcers
Naismith Memorial Basketball Hall of Fame inductees
National Basketball Association broadcasters
National Basketball Association championship-winning head coaches
Philadelphia 76ers announcers
Philadelphia 76ers head coaches
Portland Trail Blazers head coaches
Saint Joseph's Hawks baseball coaches
Saint Joseph's Hawks men's basketball coaches
Saint Joseph's Hawks men's basketball players
Sunbury Mercuries players
Sportspeople from Philadelphia